Ibrahim Vengara is a Malayalam–language playwright from Kerala, India. He has written over 50 radio plays, 25 plays and 20 monologues.

He was born on 1 August 1941 at Vengara in North Malabar as the son of Seythammadath Alikunji and Puthiya Veettil Kunjamina. His father died when he was barely three years old. He started his primary school education at Vengara Mappila Upper Primary School but the study ended in two years. Later, he learned to read and write Malayalam from an old age school, which was under the auspices of the Public Library, Taliparamba. At the age of 13, he left home. He travelled across India and did all kinds of jobs in different parts of the country.

His relationship with theatre movement began in 1962. His first work, Arthi, won first prize in a drama competition in 1965. He has worked in theatre groups Thrissur Silpi and Kozhikode Sangamam. His drama troupe Chirantana has presented some of the best professional plays Malabar has ever seen. He was imprisoned during the Emergency for writing the play Bhoothavanam. His works Ezhil Chovva and Upaharam won the award from Akashvani for best radio play in the years 1989-'90 and 1992 -'93 respectively. These plays were translated and broadcast in 14 Indian languages. He received the Kerala Sangeetha Nataka Akademi Award for Drama in 1995. His work Rajasabha won the Kerala Sahitya Akademi Award for Drama in 1997. His autobiography Green Room won the Kerala Sahitya Akademi Award for Biography and Autobiography in 2015.

Ibrahim Vengara has served as Kerala Sangeetha Nataka Academy member, Purogamana Kala Sahitya Sangham State Council Member, Akashvani Kozhikode Programme Advisory Board member, and Kerala Drama Workers Welfare Association State Council member.

Works
 Arthi (1965)
 Valmikam (1971)
 Utharam (1982)
 Ezhil Chovva (1989-'90)
 Upaharam (1992-'93)
 Padanilam (1994)
 Malikaveedu
 Rajasabha
 Oru Ithihasa Kavyam

Awards
 1997: Kerala Sahitya Akademi Award for Drama - Rajasabha
 2015: Kerala Sahitya Akademi Award for Biography and Autobiography - Green Room
 2010: Thikkodiyan Award

References

Indian male dramatists and playwrights
Dramatists and playwrights from Kerala
People from Kannur district
Malayalam-language writers
Malayalam-language dramatists and playwrights
1941 births
Recipients of the Kerala Sahitya Akademi Award
All India Radio people
20th-century Indian dramatists and playwrights
20th-century Indian male writers
21st-century Indian dramatists and playwrights
21st-century Indian male writers
Living people
Recipients of the Kerala Sangeetha Nataka Akademi Award